The Twentieth Century Tramp; or, Happy Hooligan and His Airship is an American silent short film produced and directed by Edwin S. Porter and released in 1902. This film is an adaptation of the cartoon Happy Hooligan played by J. Stuart Blackton who introduced the first film character based on a comic strip in a series of Happy Hooligan films.

The first Happy Hooligan films were a series of a number live-action comedy shorts which ran from 1900–1902, produced by Edison Studios, and may be the very first adaptation of American comics into film.

A series of several dozen animated shorts, which were produced by at least three different studios, from 1916–1921, were also based on the Happy Hooligan character. The Twentieth Century Tramp was the first science fiction film made in the United States.

Plot
A Twentieth Century up-to-date tramp flying over the chimney tops of New York City in the latest flying machine, a bicycle that has its own propeller. The vagabond flies over the top of the Equitable Life building and other New York sky scrapers, then flies over the East River and clears the top of the Brooklyn Bridge.

In making his way toward Staten Island, his flying machine blows up, and the tramp falls off his perch.

Cast
 J. Stuart Blackton as Happy Hooligan

Production
À la conquête de l'air (1901) was a short film by Ferdinand Zecca based on contemporary accounts of aviation developments. The film stars Zecca as the pilot of a fantastic flying machine, part airship, part bicycle. It was probably the first film to successfully use the split-screen technique. When it was released in the United States, À la conquête de l'air was an immediate success. Porter decided to duplicate the film, changing the landscape of Paris to that of New York.

Using the same technique that Zecca employed, who had filmed himself in his strange contraption suspended from the studio roof with the camera having half the frame blocked. Blackton played the part of the "Happy Hooligan" pedaling away in the sky. Parker then rewound the film and shot the New York city landscape in the previously blacked-out portion, creating a split-screen effect, albeit, leaving a distinctive line between the two scenes, unlike the "trick" Zecca had used, of a blended line. Both films ran for approximately one minute.

Reception
Historians Douglas Alver Menville, R. Reginald and Mary Wickizer Burgess in Futurevisions: The New Golden Age of the Science Fiction Film (1985) described the film's impact. "... previous filmmakers had used the near future as a backdrop for their stories ... "

Aviation historian Michael Paris in From the Wright Brothers to Top Gun: Aviation, Nationalism, and Popular Cinema (1995) in assessing The Twentieth Century Tramp, wrote, "Thus began a three-way relationship between aviation, comics and cinema which would mature in the 1930s."

References

Notes

Citations

Bibliography

 Menville, Douglas, R. Reginald with Mary A. Burgess. Futurevisions: The New Golden Age of the Science Fiction Film. San Bernardino, California: Borgo Press, 1985. .
 Paris, Michael. From the Wright Brothers to Top Gun: Aviation, Nationalism, and Popular Cinema. Manchester, UK: Manchester University Press, 1995. .
 Rège, Philippe. Encyclopedia of French Film Directors, Volume 1. Lanham, Maryland: Scarecrow Press, 2009. .

External links

1902 films
1902 short films
American black-and-white films
American aviation films
American silent short films
Films directed by Edwin S. Porter
1902 comedy films
Silent American comedy films
American science fiction films
1900s American films